Sadie is a 2018 American drama film written and directed by Megan Griffiths. It stars Melanie Lynskey, Danielle Brooks, Tony Hale, John Gallagher Jr., and Sophia Mitri Schloss in her screen debut. The film was produced by Lacey Leavitt and Jennessa West. It began a limited theatrical release on October 12, 2018 and received positive reviews from critics, particularity for the performances of Lynskey and newcomer Schloss.

Plot 
Adolescent Sadie lives with her mother Rae in a trailer park. Sadie's soldier father has already been away for four years, and has just reenlisted. He and Sadie exchange handwritten letters every couple of weeks. Sadie is upset, and wants her parents to be together again when her father returns from the war; Rae seems disappointed only for Sadie's sake.

Rae's best friend of twenty years is Carla. Her son Francis and self-described "old coot" Deak are Carla's son and father, and also Sadie's two best friends. Sadie feels protective of Francis, who is struggling with a bully problem at school. Deak is an ever-present sympathetic ear for the trailer park, and particularly Sadie.

Although Rae has largely given up on her soldier husband, she has remained loyal to him. Her friend Bradley, who is also Sadie's school counselor, is hoping for Rae to change her mind, but she is only interested in him as a friend. However, Rae finds her new neighbor Cyrus more tempting.

Cast

Release
Sadie premiered at the 2018 South by Southwest Film Festival. It also showed at the Seattle International Film Festival on May 27, 2018.

Reception
The site's critical consensus reads, "Led by a potentially starmaking turn from Sophia Mitri Schloss, Sadies family ties bind viewers into a uniquely disquieting drama."

References

External links
 

2018 films
American drama films
2010s English-language films
2010s American films